Zina Garrison-Jackson and Larisa Neiland were the defending champions but only Garrison-Jackson competed that year with Katrina Adams.

Adams and Garrison-Jackson lost in the second round to Mercedes Paz and Shaun Stafford.

Manon Bollegraf and Rennae Stubbs won in the final 3–6, 6–4, 6–4 against Nicole Bradtke and Kristine Radford.

Seeds
Champion seeds are indicated in bold text while text in italics indicates the round in which those seeds were eliminated. The top four seeded teams received byes into the second round.

Draw

Finals

Top half

Bottom half

Qualifying draw

External links
 1995 DFS Classic Draws
 ITF Tournament Page
 ITF doubles results page
 ITF doubles qualifying results page

Birmingham Classic (tennis)
1995 WTA Tour